Wang Peiyu (born 4 March 1978) is a Chinese Peking opera singer-actress who plays old sheng (male) roles. A winner of the Plum Blossom Award and the Magnolia Stage Award, Wang Peiyu is also known for her innovative efforts to popularize Peking opera among young people. Helped by her androgynous looks and a strong social media presence, Wang has in recent years built a large fanbase, as demonstrated by her over 1 million fans on Sina Weibo.

References

External links
 

1978 births
Living people
Chinese Peking opera actresses
Shanghai Normal University alumni
National Academy of Chinese Theatre Arts alumni
21st-century Chinese actresses
20th-century Chinese actresses
Actresses from Suzhou
Singers from Suzhou
Male impersonators in Peking opera
20th-century Chinese women singers
21st-century Chinese women singers
Affiliated Chinese Opera School of Shanghai Theatre Academy alumni